Tenth Dimension is the second studio album by English heavy metal band Blaze Bayley, then known as Blaze, released in 2002. It is a concept album.

Track listing

Personnel 
Blaze Bayley – vocals
Steve Wray – guitar
John Slater – guitar
Rob Naylor – bass
Jeff Singer – drums

References 

Blaze Bayley albums
2002 albums
SPV/Steamhammer albums
Albums produced by Andy Sneap